The Gelastocoridae (toad bugs) is a family of about 100 species of insects in the suborder Heteroptera. These fall into two genera, about 15 species of Gelastocoris from the New World and 85 of Nerthra from the Old World. They are reminiscent of toads both in the warty appearance and hopping movements of some species.

Biology
Gelastocoridae are riparian insects, generally found at the margins of streams and ponds, where they are predators of small insects. Gelastocoridae catch their prey by leaping on top of them and grasping them with their modified front legs. Members of the family are found throughout the world, but their highest diversity is in the tropics.

Adults lay their eggs in sand. Nymphs of many species cover themselves with a layer of sand grains. Apart from the no doubt considerable physical protection that the armour affords them, the layer of sand renders them effectively invisible on the ground unless they move at the wrong moment.

Diagnostic Characteristics
Gelastocoridae are short ( long) and stout, with large protuberant eyes and cryptic coloration. Many Gelastocoridae species can change their coloration to match their habitat. Like other Heteroptera, they have hemelytra for their forewings and piercing-sucking mouthparts. Their antennae are hidden.

Evolutionary history 
The oldest record of the family is the genus Cratonerthra from the Aptian aged Crato Formation of Brazil. Fossils assignable to both extant genera are known from the Cenomanian aged Burmese amber of Myanmar.

References

 
Heteroptera families
Nepomorpha